Ysabeau S. Wilce (pronounced Iz-a-bow Wils) is an  American author of young adult fantasy novels. Her novels feature the rebellious young heroine Flora Fyrdraaca and her adventures in the fictional land of Califa.

Life
Ysabeau S. Wilce was born in Northern California. As an adult she has traveled the world and lived in San Francisco, Anchorage, Miami, Mexico City, Madrid, Los Angeles, Maryland, Phoenix, Philadelphia, and Brooklyn. She has a graduate degree in military history and lives in San Francisco.

Works

Novels
Flora Segunda: Being the Magickal Mishaps of a Girl of Spirit, Her Glass-Gazing Sidekick, Two Ominous Butlers (One Blue), a House with Eleven Thousand Rooms, and a Red Dog (2007)
Flora's Dare: How a Girl of Spirit Gambles All to Expand Her Vocabulary, Confront a Bouncing Boy Terror, and Try to Save Califa from a Shaky Doom (Despite Being Confined to Her Room) (2008)
Flora's Fury: How a Girl of Spirit and a Red Dog Confound Their Friends, Astound Their Enemies, and Learn the Importance of Packing Light (2012)

Short stories
"Metal More Attractive" (2004) appeared in the Magazine of Fantasy & Science Fiction
"The Biography of a Bouncing Boy Terror" (2004) appeared in Isaac Asimov's Science Fiction Magazine
"The Lineaments of Gratified Desire" (2006) appears in the Magazine of Fantasy & Science Fiction; The Year's Best Fantasy and Horror, 2006, edited by Ellen Datlow, Kelly Link and Gavin Grant.
"Quartermaster Returns" (2007) appears in Eclipse, edited by Jonathan Strahan
"Hand in Glove" (2011) appears in Steampunk!, edited by Kelly Link and Gavin Grant.

Short-story collections
Prophecies, Libels & Dreams: Stories of Califa (2014)

Awards
Winner of the 2008 Andre Norton Award for Young Adult Science Fiction and Fantasy for Flora’s Dare: How a Girl of Spirit Gambles All to Expand Her Vocabulary, Confront a Bouncing Boy Terror, and Try to Save Califa from a Shaky Doom (Despite Being Confined to Her Room)
 Two-time Otherwise Award Honor List Member
A New York Times Editor's Choice
A VOYA Best Book of 2006
A Kirkus Best Book of 2007

References

External links 
The Official Site of Ysabeau Wilce
The Califa Police Gazette
The Califa Police Gazette Society Page
Interview: Ysabeau Wilce
Author Interview: Ysabeau S. Wilce on Flora Segunda

Living people
21st-century American novelists
21st-century American women writers
American fantasy writers
American women short story writers
American women novelists
American writers of young adult literature
Women science fiction and fantasy writers
Women writers of young adult literature
Writers from California
21st-century American short story writers
Year of birth missing (living people)